Marie-Philip Poulin-Nadeau  (born March 28, 1991) is a Canadian ice hockey forward, currently with the PWHPA and who serves as captain of the Canadian national team. A three-time Olympic and three-time World champion with the Canadian national team, Poulin famously scored the game-winning goal in the gold medal games in three out of four of the Olympics in which she competed (2010, 2014 and 2022), for which she was dubbed Captain Clutch by her teammates and the media. Following another game-winning goal at the 2021 IIHF Women's World Championship, she completed an unprecedented "golden goal hat trick" at major international championships. Since 2015 she has served as the captain of Team Canada, leading them to a silver medal at the 2018 Winter Olympics and a gold medal at the 2022 Winter Olympics.

Professionally, Poulin played for and captained Les Canadiennes de Montreal in the now-defunct Canadian Women's Hockey League, before joining the Professional Women's Hockey Players Association. While playing with Les Canadiennes she won the Clarkson Cup twice and was named CWHL MVP three times. She is the first female hockey player to win the Northern Star Award as Canada's top athlete of the year, and the second to receive the Bobbie Rosenfeld Award as The Canadian Press' female athlete of the year. She is widely considered to be among the best women's hockey stars of all-time.

Playing career

Montreal Stars
Poulin spent 2007–08 with the Montreal Stars of the Canadian Women's Hockey League. She appeared in only 16 games, but managed to lead all rookies in scoring with 22 goals and 21 assists. So dominant was she in half a season as a 16-year-old rookie that she finished runner up in the CWHL Most Valuable Player vote by club captains. She was also a recipient of the Montreal Canadiens scholarship program in January 2008. In 2008–09, she played with her school team (Dawson College), but also played as an associate player with the Stars. At year's end, she helped the Stars win the Clarkson Cup over the Minnesota Whitecaps in Kingston, Ontario in March 2009. In the championship game, she assisted on a goal by Caroline Ouellette.

Boston University
Poulin debuted with the Boston University Terriers women's ice hockey program during the 2010–11 season. On October 2, 2010, she scored the first goal of her NCAA career, during a 5–4 loss at North Dakota. With her third shorthanded goal of the season on October 15, 2010, she tied BU's single-season record for shorthanded tallies in just four games. She led all NCAA freshmen in goals (9) and points per game (2.00) during October 2010. In addition, she led all Hockey East freshmen in goals, assists and points, and ranked during the month. She was ranked first among all Hockey East players in shorthanded goals with three. In the first seven games of her NCAA career, she had a seven-game point-scoring streak consisting of nine goals and seven assists. On December 7 and 10, two wins over Northeastern and Harvard, Poulin registered three goals. In both games, she had a total of 11 shots on goal and a +2 rating. On December 10, she scored two goals and a game-high eight shots as BU prevailed by a 5–3 mark over Harvard.

On January 15 and 16, 2011, Poulin recorded five points (2 goals, 3 assists) in BU's two wins over Boston College and Maine. Against BC, Poulin notched a power-play goal and two assists. Versus the Maine Black Bears, she registered a goal and an assist. On January 22, 2011, Poulin recorded a hat trick, including two power-play goals as BU prevailed over Vermont in a 4–0 win. The win was the Terriers' 100th win in program history. Poulin broke BU's single-season points record with her second goal of the game and later tied the single-season goals record with her third marker. She became the first Terriers player to be honoured as Hockey East Rookie of the Year in March 2011. A fracture of the shoulder did not hold her from action for the 2011–12 season.

On May 11, 2012, Terriers head coach Brian Durocher announced that the captains for the 2012–13 campaign would be Poulin and Jill Cardella. For the 2014–15 Boston University Terriers women's ice hockey season, Poulin was appointed team captain. As captain, she would lead the team to its fourth consecutive Hockey East championship. In the aftermath of the 2015 Hockey East tournament, she would join Shannon Doyle and fellow Montreal resident Kayla Tutino on the All-Tournament Team.

Les Canadiennes de Montreal
Poulin returned to the CWHL in the autumn of 2015. Selected in the 2015 CWHL Draft, Poulin would finish the season as the recipient of the Angela James Bowl. At the conclusion of the 2015–16 CWHL season, she was the inaugural winner of the Jayna Hefford Trophy.

Poulin scored two goals in the 2017 Clarkson Cup final in Ottawa.

Poulin decided not to return to Les Canadiennes after the Olympics for the run up to the 2018 Clarkson Cup.

Poulin scored a hat trick against the Toronto Furies on January 5, 2019 in a 3–1 match played in Brossard, Quebec.

PWHPA 
After the CWHL collapsed in May 2019, Poulin joined the ForTheGame movement that led to the creation of the PWHPA. As a member of the PWHPA, she took part in the Elite Women's Showcase at the 2020 NHL All-Star Game. She was afterwards voted as the best female hockey player in the world by NHL players, after having finished second in the vote the year before. In December 2019, she had been named among the top-4 Québecois athletes of the 2010s decade by the readers of La Presse.

She was among several high-profile PWHPA members who reacted indifferently to the news of the NWHL's expansion into Canada with the addition of the Toronto Six, stating that "I think there's a reason why many of us are not playing in that league."

At the 2021 Secret Cup, which was the Canadian leg of the 2020–21 PWHPA Dream Gap Tour, Marie-Philip Poulin scored the third-period game-winner for Team Bauer (Montreal) in the 4-2 championship win over Team Sonnet (Toronto). Additionally, she recorded two assists for a three-point performance. Overall, Poulin was the scoring champion in the 2021 Secret Cup, with five goals and six assists in five games.

International play

Early career (2007–2009)
At the age of sixteen years, she made her Team Canada debut with the Under-18 national team during a three-game exhibition series in Prince George, BC between Canada and the United States in the fall of 2007. Playing for Canada Red, Poulin racked up four goals and one assist in two games against Sweden's national women's team, the 2006 Olympic silver medalists. Her 2.5 points per game put her atop the all-time list for the national women's team.

She participated at the 2008 IIHF World Women's U18 Championship in Calgary and was Canada's leading scorer. In a January 9, 2008 contest versus Germany (contested at the inaugural World Women's Under-18 hockey championship), Poulin notched one goal and two assists in a 10–1 win. She was part of the team that won a silver medal, finishing the tournament with eight goals and six assists in five games. In two seasons with Canada's national women's under-18 team, Poulin became the all-time leading scorer in U18 team history with 31 points in 17 games, and winning a second silver medal in 2009.

She made her debut on the Canadian senior national team, earning silver at the 2009 IIHF Women's World Championship in Hameenlinna, Finland.

Vancouver to Sochi (2010–2014)
Poulin scored both goals during Team Canada's 2–0 win in the gold medal game against the United States at the 2010 Winter Olympics.  At the end of the tournament, Poulin was named to the tournament all-star team. At the 2010 Four Nations Cup, she scored a hat trick again Finland on November 12.

In a March 31, 2012 exhibition game versus the United States, Poulin assisted on a goal scored by Laura Fortino in a 1–0 win at the Ottawa Civic Centre. It was the first international goal scored by Fortino. In a game versus Russia at the 2012 IIHF Women's World Championship, Poulin put in a three-point performance (one goal, two assists) in a 14–1 victory. By claiming the gold medal at the 2012 IIHF Women's World Championship, Poulin (along with Catherine Ward) became the sixth and seventh members of the (not yet recognized by the IIHF) Triple Gold Club for Women (having won gold in the Olympic Games, the IIHF World Championships, and the Clarkson Cup). In August 2012, Poulin was named the captain of the Canadian Under-22 team that competed in an exhibition series versus the United States Under-22 squad in Calgary, Alberta.

Named to her second Olympic team for the 2014 Winter Olympics in Sochi, Poulin scored the game-tying and game-winning goals in Team Canada's 3–2 overtime win in the gold medal game against the United States.  The first goal came with 54.6 seconds left in regulation, the latter on a 4-on-3 power play at 8:10 of overtime. Poulin's teammates dubbed her "Captain Clutch" as a result of these performances, a nickname which was widely adopted in media and fan coverage subsequently.

Captaincy (2015–present)
Poulin was named as team captain for the 2015 IIHF Women's World Championship, and continued in the post through to the women's tournament at the 2018 Winter Olympics in Pyeongchang. She registered six points for Team Canada in the course of the tournament, including a goal in the final game that put Canada into the lead before they were subsequently overtaken to lose the game 3–2 in a shootout to Team USA.

Due to a knee injury sustained in the CWHL, Poulin withdrew early in the 2019 IIHF Women's World Championship after playing less than five minutes, and did not play for the rest of the series. In her absence, Team Canada was defeated by Finland in the semi-final, missing the gold medal game for the first time in the history of the event.

After a lengthy time off-ice due to injury and the cancellation of the 2020 edition of the world championships due to the COVID-19 pandemic, Poulin returned to the ice for a PWHPA showcase in May 2021. At the 2021 IIHF Women's World Championship, held in a bubble in Calgary, Poulin sustained an injury blocking a shot from a Swiss player in the group stage. She was rested for the remainder of group play, as well as the quarter-final match, returning for the team's semi-final match against Switzerland, where she scored a goal as part of a 4–0 victory. In the final against the United States, Poulin scored the golden goal in overtime, earning Team Canada the gold medal over the United States for the first time since 2012. She was named player of the game. Poulin's three golden goals at major tournaments far outstripped other players in international ice hockey.

On January 11, 2022, Poulin was named to Canada's 2022 Olympic team. She served as one of Canada's co-flag bearers at the opening ceremonies, alongside short track speed skater Charles Hamelin. Poulin logged a career-best 17 points (6 goals and 11 assists) during the women's tournament, capping it with a two-goal performance in Canada's 3–2 victory over the United States in the gold medal game. She became the only player in history — male or female — to score goals in four straight Olympic finals. She has scored a total of seven goals in her four Olympic finals. On the team, she said "We celebrate each other's success, we want to succeed and to be honest it just showed tonight." Later in 2022 at the 2022 IIHF Women's World Championship, Poulin captained Team Canada to its third major international title inside a span of twelve months. This was the first time Canada had won consecutive Women's World titles in 18 years. In October 2022, Canadian sports channel TSN named her "best women's hockey player on the planet," adding "there's no denying that Poulin is the best player in the world; the debate is whether she is the best ever." Further honours followed by year's end, when she received the inaugural Northern Star Award (formerly the Lou Marsh Trophy) as Canada's top athlete of 2022, and was The Canadian Press's choice for Bobbie Rosenfeld Award for female athlete of the year.

Consultancy career
In June 2022, Poulin was hired by the Montreal Canadiens as a player development consultant. She said she felt "very lucky that they hired me and they have confidence in me not only for my hockey experience but as a person as well." Canadiens owner Geoff Molson called Poulin "a winner — she knows how to win — and our players are young and they need to learn that as well."

Personal life 
Poulin studied psychology while playing for Boston University. Her brother, Pier-Alexandre Poulin, played 116 games in the QMJHL with the St. John's Fog Devils and the Chicoutimi Saguenéens.

Career statistics

Regular season and playoffs 
Note:  Montréal Stars changed their name to Les Canadiennes de Montréal in 2015.

International

Awards and honours
2021 Hockey Canada Isobel Gathorne-Hardy Award 
 2022 Northern Star Award
 2022 Bobbie Rosenfeld Award

AA
 2008–09 Player of the Year Award: Ligue de hockey féminin collégial AA
 2008–09 Rookie of the Year Award:  Ligue de hockey féminin collégial AA

CWHL
 CWHL Outstanding Rookie (2007–08, unanimous selection)
 CWHL All-Rookie Team (2007–08)
 CWHL Eastern All Stars (2007–08)
 CWHL Monthly Top Scorer (October 2007)

NCAA
 2011 Patty Kazmaier Award Nominee
 2011 New England Women's Division I All-Star selection
 2015 Patty Kazmaier Award Top-3 Finalist
 2015 CCM Hockey Women's Division I All-Americans, First Team

Hockey East
Hockey East Pure Hockey Player of the Week (Week of October 18, 2010)
Hockey East Rookie of the Month (October 2010)
Hockey East Pro Ambitions Rookie of the Week (Week of December 13, 2010)
Hockey East Pro Ambitions Rookie of the Week, (Week of January 3, 2011)
Hockey East Pro Ambitions Rookie of the Week (Week of January 17, 2011)
Hockey East Pro Ambitions Rookie of the Week (Week of January 24, 2011)
Hockey East Player of the Month (January 2011) 
 2011 Hockey East All-Rookie Team (unanimous selection)
 2011 Hockey East Rookie of the Year
 Hockey East Player of the Month (January 2015)
 Hockey East Player of the Month (February 2015)
 2014–15 Hockey East First Team All-Star

IIHF and Olympics
 Directorate Award, Best Forward, 2008 IIHF Under 18 Women's World Championships
 4 Nations Cup gold medallist (2009)
 IIHF Women's World Hockey Championship gold medalist (2012, 2021, 2022), silver medallist (2009, 2011, 2013, 2015, 2016, 2017) and bronze medalist (2019)
 Olympic gold medalist (2010, 2014, 2022) and silver medalist (2018)
 Captain of the gold medal-winning Canadian Olympic team in 2022
 Vancouver 2010 and Beijing 2022, Media All-Star Team

References

External links

Official website

1991 births
Living people
French Quebecers
Angela James Bowl winners
Boston University Terriers women's ice hockey players
Canadian expatriate ice hockey players in the United States
Canadian women's ice hockey forwards
Clarkson Cup champions
Dawson College alumni
Ice hockey people from Quebec
Ice hockey players at the 2010 Winter Olympics
Ice hockey players at the 2014 Winter Olympics
Ice hockey players at the 2018 Winter Olympics
Ice hockey players at the 2022 Winter Olympics
Medalists at the 2010 Winter Olympics
Medalists at the 2014 Winter Olympics
Medalists at the 2018 Winter Olympics
Medalists at the 2022 Winter Olympics
Les Canadiennes de Montreal players
Olympic gold medalists for Canada
Olympic silver medalists for Canada
Olympic ice hockey players of Canada
Olympic medalists in ice hockey
People from Chaudière-Appalaches
Professional Women's Hockey Players Association players